Equivalent narcotic depth (END) is used in technical diving as a way of estimating the narcotic effect of a breathing gas mixture, such as heliox and trimix. The method is, for a given mix and depth, to calculate the depth which would produce the same narcotic effect as when breathing air.

The equivalent narcotic depth of a breathing gas mix at a particular depth is calculated by finding the depth of a dive when breathing air that would have the same total partial pressure of nitrogen and oxygen as the breathing gas in question.

Since air is composed of approximately 21% oxygen and 79% nitrogen, the narcotic gases make up 100% of the mix, or equivalently the fraction of the total gases which are narcotic is 1.0. Oxygen is assumed equivalent in narcotic effect to nitrogen for this purpose. In contrast, the oxygen and nitrogen component in a trimix containing, for example, 40% helium accounts for only 60% of the mix, i.e. a fraction of 0.6. In a trimix, the fraction of narcotic gases (oxygen and nitrogen) is equal to 1.0 minus the fraction of non-narcotic gas (helium).

Calculations 
In diving calculations it is assumed unless otherwise stipulated that the atmospheric pressure is 1 bar or 1 atm. and that the diving medium is water.
The ambient pressure at depth is the sum of the hydrostatic pressure due to depth and the atmospheric pressure on the surface.

Metres
The partial pressure of a gas in a mixture at a particular depth in metres is given by:
 fraction of gas × (depth/10 + 1)
So the equivalent narcotic depth can be calculated as follows:
 partial pressure of narcotic gases in air at END = partial pressure of narcotic gases in trimix at a given depth.
or
 (fraction of O2 + fraction of N2) in air × (END/10 + 1) = (fraction of O2 + fraction of N2) in trimix × (depth/10 +1)
which gives:
 1.0 × (END/10 + 1) = (fraction of O2 + fraction of N2) in trimix × (depth/10 +1)
resulting in:
 END = (depth + 10) × (fraction of O2 + fraction of N2) in trimix − 10
Since (fraction of O2 + fraction of N2) in a trimix = (1 − fraction of helium), the following formula is equivalent:
END = (depth + 10) × (1 − fraction of helium) − 10

Working the earlier example, for a gas mix containing 40% helium being used at 60 metres, the END is:
END = (60 + 10) × (1 − 0.4) − 10
END = 70 × 0.6 − 10
END = 42 − 10
END = 32 metres
So at 60 metres on this mix, the diver would feel the same narcotic effect as a dive on air to 32 metres.

Feet
The partial pressure of a gas in a mixture at a particular depth in feet is given by:
 fraction of gas × (depth/33 + 1)
So the equivalent narcotic depth can be calculated as follows:
 partial pressure of narcotic gases in air at END = partial pressure of narcotic gases in trimix at a given depth.
or
 (fraction of O2 + fraction of N2) in air × (END/33 + 1) = (fraction of O2 + fraction of N2) in trimix × (depth/33 +1)
which gives:
 1.0 × (END/33 + 1) = (fraction of O2 + fraction of N2) in trimix × (depth/33 +1)
resulting in:
 END = (depth + 33) × (fraction of O2 + fraction of N2) in trimix − 33
Since (fraction of O2 + fraction of N2) in a trimix = (1 − fraction of helium), the following formula is equivalent:
END = (depth + 33) × (1 − fraction of helium) − 33

As an example, for a gas mix containing 40% helium being used at 200 feet, the END is:
END = (200 + 33) × (1 − 0.4) − 33
END = 233 × 0.6 − 33
END = 140 − 33
END = 107 feet
So at 200 feet on this mix, the diver would feel the same narcotic effect as a dive on air to 107 feet.

Oxygen narcosis 
Since there is evidence that oxygen plays a part in the narcotic effects of a gas mixture, the NOAA diving manual recommends treating oxygen and nitrogen as equally narcotic.
This is now preferred to the previous method of considering only nitrogen as narcotic, since it is more conservative.
In this analysis, it is assumed that the narcotic potentials of nitrogen and oxygen are similar.
Although oxygen has greater lipid solubility than nitrogen and therefore should be more narcotic (Meyer-Overton correlation), it is likely that some of the oxygen is metabolised, thus reducing its effect to a level similar to that of nitrogen.

References

Underwater diving safety
Dive planning